Anil Joshi is a politician from Amritsar, Punjab, India who was serving as Minister for Local Bodies, Medical Education & Research in the previous Punjab Government. He joined the Shiromani Akali Dal party in 2021 following his expulsion from the BJP.  He was first elected as a member of Punjab Legislative Assembly from Amritsar North Constituency in 2007 and then re-elected in 2012.

Early life
Joshi was born on 31 March 1964 in Sanghe, District Tarn Taran. His father's name is Kishori Lal Joshi and mother's name Pushpa Rani Joshi.

Political career
He successfully contested election from Amritsar North in 2007 as a BJP candidate. In 2012 he was re-elected from Amritsar North.  He was cabinet minister and holding portfolio of Local Bodies, Medical Education & Research. He lost to Sunil Dutti (Congress) by 14000 votes in 2017 Punjab assembly election. He was colloquially known as "Vikas Purush" because of his significant development work done in North Amritsar Constituency. In July 2021 he left the Bhartiya Janta Party for six years for opposing the party line in the farmers' protest.. He joined Sharomani Akali Dal in August 2021.

Personal life
He married Monika Joshi on 7 October 1992. He has two sons (Paras Joshi and Amit Joshi).

References

1964 births
Bharatiya Janata Party politicians from Punjab
Living people
Politicians from Amritsar
Punjab, India MLAs 2007–2012
Punjab, India MLAs 2012–2017
State cabinet ministers of Punjab, India
Shiromani Akali Dal politicians